The Pai Tavytera are an indigenous people of Paraguay and Brazil. They primarily live in Amambay Department in Paraguay and the Brazilian state of Mato Grosso do Sul.

Name 
The Pai Tavytera are also known as the Ava, Caaguá, Caingua, Caiwá, Kaa'wa, Kainguá, Kaiowá, Kaiwá, Kayova, Montese, Paï, Paï-Cayuä, Paï-Tavyterä, Paingua, Pan, and Tavytera people. "Paï-Tavytera" is an arbitrary name given to northern Guaraní people of eastern Paraguay. They are closely related to the Guarani-Kaiowá people of Brazil.

Language
The Pai Tavytera speak the Pai Tavytera language, which is a Tupi-Guarani language, division Guarani I. The tribe is rapidly adopting the more mainstream Guarani language.

History 
The Pai Tavytera are mostly likely the descendants of the Itatin Guaraní. They encountered Jesuit missionaries in the 17th century during the reducciones of eastern Paraguay. Many of them resisted assimilation. Following the violent War of the Triple Alliance in the 1870s, their lands were left alone, except for lumberers and harvesters of yerba mate. In recent years, an influx of settlers have disrupted the Pai Tavyter's hunting lifestyle.

Altar

The wood altar is the central institution in the religious beliefs of the Pai Tavytera. The altar, called mba’e marangatu in Guaraní is considered a sacred sanctuary and a focal point of the community. The altars usually resides in the homes of the spiritual leaders of the Pai Tavytera Indians or important leaders. The altar is a place where the community gathers around for worship or to discuss matters that are important to the community.
 
Altars include wooden rods that represents deities or saints. From those rods hangs a gourd used for baptizing children, and the medicine man's gourd rattle, the most important item for the spiritual healer to start his prayer that is a song and a dance to communicate with the spirits. Part of the altar is a taquara bamboo staff, a woman's musical instrument that gives rhythm to the rituals.

Agriculture

In the sub-tropical environment of eastern Paraguay, Pai Tavyter practice swidden agriculture. Their primary crop is maize, supplemented with manioc. They also cultivate citrus trees, bananas, cotton, pineapples, rice, soybeans, and medicinal plants. Chickens, pigs, cattle, horses, and donkeys are popular farm animals.

Artwork

Pai Tavytera people are known for making necklaces made from carved wood and colorful seeds of different fruits. They use urucú, a red dye made from Bixa orellana for body painting. Cotton and feathers, such as toucan, are used for headdresses. Labrets are made from resin. Men typically weave baskets, while women make ceramics.

The tribe is also being consulted in interpreting ancient rock art in Amambay. A hill, Jasuka Venda is an important cultural site for Pai Tavyera people that has petroglyphs in the "footstep style." Jasuka Venda is where Pai Tavytera oral history says God created the universe.

Notes

Further reading
 Maybury-Lewis, David, and James Howe (1980). The Indian Peoples of Paraguay: Their Plight and Their Prospects. Cultural Survival Special Report No. 2. Cambridge, Mass.
 Melia, Bartomeu, Georg Grünberg, and Friedl Grünberg (1976). "Los paï-tavyterã: Etnografía guaraní del Paraguay contemporáneo." Suplemento Antropológico (Asunción: Universidad Católica Nuestra Señora de la Asunción, Centro de Estudios Antropológicos) 11(1-2): 151–295.
 Métraux, Alfred (1958). "The Guarani." In Handbook of South American Indians, edited by Julian H. Steward. Vol. 3, The Tropical Forest Tribes, 69–94. Bureau of American Ethnology Bulletin 143. Washington, D.C.: Smithsonian Institution.
 Monteiro, John Manuel (1992). "Os guarani e a história do Brasil meridional: Séculos XVI-XVII." In Historia dos indios no Brasil, edited by Manuela Carneiro da Cunha, 475–498. São Paulo: Editora Schwarez.
 Vogt, Franz (1904). "Die Indianer des oberen Paraná." Mitteilungen der Anthropologischen Gesellschaft in Wien 34:200-221, 352–377.

External links
 "The Guarani Altar: A Donation Tells a Deep Story", American Indian, Smithsonian

Indigenous peoples in Brazil
Indigenous peoples in Paraguay
Indigenous peoples of the Gran Chaco
Hunter-gatherers of South America